Patrick Kiernan (born November 20, 1968) is a Canadian-American television host, appearing as the morning news anchor of NY1 since 1997. He is widely known in New York City for his "In the Papers" feature, in which he summarizes the colorful content in New York City's daily newspapers, replete with his deadpan humor. Kiernan has also hosted game shows and appeared in films and on television either as himself or as a reporter.

Career
Kiernan began his news career in 1988 at CKRA-FM in Edmonton while a business student at the University of Alberta. He later made a transition from radio to television at Edmonton's CFRN News. In 1993, he moved to another Edmonton television station, CITV, where he produced the weekday primetime newscast. Kiernan moved to New York City three years later to work for Time Warner, where he soon became the morning anchor of NY1. Kiernan is usually on air from 5 AM until 10 AM, weekdays. He was on air on the morning of the September 11th terrorist attacks, and remained on air for nearly 15 hours that day. Kiernan also serves as a correspondent for Business News Network in Canada. From 2000 to 2004, Kiernan was the co-anchor of the CNNfn program "The Money Gang." His co-hosts included Christine Romans and two fellow Canadians, Amanda Lang and Ali Velshi. In 2008, Kiernan created Pat's Papers, a website curation of his favorite stories from newspapers across the United States.

In January 2011, Kiernan joined TrivWorks as a "Special Host" available for select corporate team building events.

In January 2014, Kiernan added an afternoon job to his long-running morning routine, joining WABC (AM) Radio to host a 5 pm weeknight news/talk show recapping the events of the day in and around New York City. He left WABC in early 2015.

Kiernan joined Bloomberg TV Canada in 2015 as the host of the channel's Thursday night Bloomberg North program. The half-hour report reviews the week's global business events from a Canadian perspective.

The routine of his early morning commute to work at NY1 is the subject of Kiernan's first children's book Good Morning, City, published by Farrar, Straus and Giroux in 2016. A starred review in Publishers Weekly explains that "Kiernan knows a lot about how a city shakes off sleep."

Kiernan has appeared in cameos as himself or as a reporter in such films as The Interpreter (2005), Night at the Museum (2006), True North (film) (2006), The Son of No One (2011), Iron Man 3 (2013), and The Amazing Spider-Man 2 (2014). He has been featured in publications including New York magazine ("Morning Star", February 5, 2001), the New York Post ("Dream Job: Pat Kiernan", October 3, 2005), and The New Yorker ("Explainer"; May 21, 2012).

On March 7, 2012, he served as guest co-host with Kelly Ripa on Live! with Kelly. The appearance came nearly a year after a New York Magazine article in which he declared his interest in the soon-to-be-vacant job because it was a "rare intersection" of his knowledge of New York City and his passion for pop culture. The New York Daily News covered the March 7 program with a minute-by-minute live blog.

In 2013, Canada's Report on Business named Kiernan one of the "16 Canadians We Want Back".

Game shows
Kiernan has also hosted several game shows, all produced by Michael Davies: Studio 7, which aired on The WB Television Network in the summer of 2004; two seasons of The World Series of Pop Culture, which began airing on VH1 July 10, 2006, and July 9, 2007, respectively. He served as the off-screen "questioner" of the U.S. version of Grand Slam, which premiered on GSN on August 4, 2007.

In May 2013 Kiernan joined Crowd Rules as one of the two co-hosts on the small business competition series. The ratings for the series fell below expectations and CNBC has yet to air six of the eight episodes initially produced.

Personal life
Kiernan was married to Dawn Lerohl on June 4, 1994. They moved to Manhattan in 1996 and are citizens of both the United States and Canada. They used to reside on the Upper West Side, but in April 2012 Kiernan purchased a $2 million townhouse in the Williamsburg section of Brooklyn. They have two children, Lucy (October 27, 2001) and Maeve (July 12, 2004).

Filmography
All roles are credited as himself, unless otherwise noted.

Film

Television

References

External links
 
 
 
 
 
 

1968 births
Living people
American television journalists
Canadian game show hosts
Journalists from Alberta
People from Calgary
Television anchors from New York City
University of Alberta alumni